Saralan (also Romanized as Sārālān; also known as Sārān) is a village in Baranduzchay-ye Shomali Rural District, in the Central District of Urmia County, West Azerbaijan Province, Iran. As the 2006 census, its population was 319, with 89 families.

References 

Populated places in Urmia County